The 33rd South American Championships in Athletics were held in Santiago, Chile between 12 and 15 September.

Medal summary

Men's events

Women's events

Medal table

See also
 1985 in athletics (track and field)

External links
 Men Results – GBR Athletics
 Women Results – GBR Athletics
 Medallists

S
South American Championships in Athletics
International athletics competitions hosted by Chile
1985 in South American sport
1985 in Chilean sport